The Women's Japan Basketball League is the premier women's basketball league in Japan.

History
Chanson Cosmetics was a dominant team in the early 1990s, winning 6 championships in a row.

Teams
2022–23 season
 Aisin Wings
 Chanson V-Magic
 Denso Iris
 Fujitsu Red Wave
 Haneda Vickies
 Himeji Egrets
 Hitachi High-Technologies Cougars
 JX-Eneos Sunflowers
 Mitsubishi Electric Koalas
 Niigata Albirex BB Rabbits
 Toyota Antelopes
 Toyota Boshoku Sunshine Rabbits
 Yamanashi Queenbees
 Prestige International Aranmare Akita

Champions

 1999–00: Chanson V-Magic
 2000–01: JOMO Sunflowers
 2001–02: JOMO Sunflowers
 2002–03: JOMO Sunflowers
 2003–04: JOMO Sunflowers
 2004–05: Chanson V-Magic
 2005–06: Chanson V-Magic
 2006–07: JOMO Sunflowers
 2007–08: Fujitsu Redwave
 2008–09: JOMO Sunflowers
 2009–10: JOMO Sunflowers
 2010–11: JX Sunflowers
 2011–12: JX Sunflowers
 2012–13: JX Sunflowers
 2013–14: JX Sunflowers
 2014–15: JX-Eneos Sunflowers
 2015–16: JX-Eneos Sunflowers
 2016–17: JX-Eneos Sunflowers
 2017–18: JX-Eneos Sunflowers
 2018–19: JX-Eneos Sunflowers
 2019–20: Cancelled due to the COVID-19 pandemic in Japan
 2020–21: Toyota Antelopes
 2021–22: Toyota Antelopes

References

External links
 Official website

Basketball leagues in Japan
Women's basketball leagues in Asia
Sports leagues established in 1999
1999 establishments in Japan
Women's basketball in Japan
Professional sports leagues in Japan